Algonquin is a village in McHenry and Kane counties, Illinois, in the United States. As of the 2020 census, the village's population was 29,700.

The village is known as "The Gem of the Fox River Valley", referring to the location of its downtown.

Geography
Algonquin is located in southeastern McHenry County and northeastern Kane County at  (42.162741, −88.302571). It is bordered to the north by Lake in the Hills, to the northeast by Cary, to the east by Barrington Hills, and to the south by Carpentersville.

Approximately 78% of the village area is in McHenry County, with the remainder in Kane County.

Demographics

2020 census

2010 Census
As of the census of 2010, there were 30,046 people, 10,247 households, and 8,170 families living in the village. There were 10,727 housing units, of which 480, or 4.5%, were vacant. The racial makeup of the village was 87.2% White, 1.7% African American, 0.2% Native American, 7.3% Asian, 0.04% Pacific Islander, 1.8% some other race, and 1.7% from two or more races. Hispanic or Latino of any race were 6.8% of the population.

Of the 10,247 households in the village, 44.6% had children under the age of 18 living with them, 69.3% were headed by married couples living together, 7.4% had a female householder with no husband present, and 20.3% were non-families. 16.4% of all households were made up of individuals, and 5.1% were someone living alone who was 65 years of age or older. The average household size was 2.93, and the average family size was 3.32.

29.0% of the village population were under the age of 18, 6.5% were from 18 to 24, 27.3% were from 25 to 44, 29.2% were from 45 to 64, and 8.1% were 65 years of age or older. The median age was 38.3 years. For every 100 females, there were 97.1 males. For every 100 females age 18 and over, there were 95.0 males.

For the period 2013-2017, the estimated median annual income for a household in the village was $103,291, and the median income for a family was $115,111. Male full-time workers had a median income of $77,443 versus $56,544 for females. The per capita income for the village was $40,155. About 2.5% of families and 3.7% of the total population were below the poverty line, including 3.6% of those under age 18 and 4.7% of those age 65 or over.

History
Long before Europeans settled in Algonquin, the Potawatomi Native Americans originally inhabited the land. Algonquin was the location of Indian burial mounds known in the 1800s as the Algonquin Mounds. By 1834 the first settler of Algonquin, Samuel Gillilan, came to the area from Virginia. Settlers Dr. Cornish, Dr. Plumleigh, Eli Henderson, Alex Dawson, and William Jackson arrived shortly thereafter. There was some dispute regarding the original name of Algonquin, and numerous other names were suggested including Denny's Ferry, Cornish Ferry, Cornishville, and Osceola. But Samuel Edwards suggested the name Algonquin and on December 23, 1847, the name Algonquin became official.

The first signs of economic growth occurred in 1855 when the town saw the construction of the railroad, which enabled farmers in the neighboring area to have other means of getting their products to the markets in Chicago. Finally on February 25, 1890, the Village of Algonquin was formed.

The Village Hall of Algonquin was erected on January 31, 1907, at 2 South Main Street, and is still standing today, where it functions as a historical landmark and community gathering place. It served as the village hall of Algonquin until a new village hall was built at 2200 Harnish Drive in 1996.

From 1906 to 1913, the automobile companies began to go to the Algonquin Hill Climbs, which was an event where if an automobile was able to make it up a series of steep hills in the village, it would be given the stamp of approval. And because of that, the Algonquin Cup was formed which received national recognition at the time. The two hills used in the race were the Phillips Hill which extends from Illinois Route 31 to the cemetery and Perry Hill, located south of downtown, and which is now Lundstrom Lane. The village created a new hill for the race called Huntington Hill, which is now Huntington Drive. A park stands in place of the finish line of Huntington Hill at the intersection of Huntington Drive and Circle Drive which is called Hill Climb Park. The festival in recognition of the event continues to be held each year.

Algonquin road route 62 now, was once noted as the first bridge to be installed on an incline. The first bridge was level with a steep incline headed east. It was later replaced with a 4 lane bridge with an incline to reduce stress on vehicles headed east.

For much of the 20th century, Algonquin was a quasi-resort town and people from the Chicago area would visit the town in order to escape urban life. The Fox River offered immense recreational opportunities and several summer homes were constructed. Soon, more people began living in Algonquin year-round. Algonquin remained a small town for much of the 20th Century, growing steadily, until the 1980s, when the village's population exploded with new residential construction. The development continued in earnest in the 1990s and 2000s. The village's first shopping center, Algonquin Town Center, was constructed in the late 1980s on East Algonquin Road and numerous die & mold industries were established west of downtown. In the 1990s, development shifted to Randall Road, which saw the construction of numerous retailers, restaurants, and services, beginning in 1993. In 2004, the 80-store Algonquin Commons outdoor mall (the largest outdoor mall in Illinois) opened for business, followed by the Algonquin Galleria outdoor mall, which is under development and saw its first stores open in 2006.

Government

Village of Algonquin
Algonquin has a council-manager form of government, where an elected Board of Trustees, led by the Village President, establishes policy & vision and approves ordinances & resolutions, while an appointed Village Manager leads a team of professional staff that carries out the policies and daily operations of the village.

The Village President is Debby Sosine and the current Trustees are Laura Brehmer, Jerry Glogowski, Janis Jasper, Jerry Kautz, John Spella, and Jim Steigert. The Village Clerk, who handles village records, is Gerald Kautz. All officials are elected to four-year terms which are staggered to maintain consistency. The current Village Manager is Tim Schloneger.

Fire protection
Algonquin's fire protection and rescue services are handled by either the Algonquin-Lake in the Hills Fire Protection District (ALITHFPD), the Huntley Fire Protection District (HFPD), or the Carpentersville Countryside Fire Protection District (CCFPD).

Education

School District 300
Community Unit School District 300, a large district generally along and east of Randall Rd. The District 300 schools serving Algonquin include:

Neubert Elementary School (K-5) serves students residing in areas immediately west of the Old Town District.
Lincoln Prairie Elementary School (P-5) in nearby Lake in the Hills serves students residing in sections of the village near Randall Road.
Eastview Elementary School (K-5) serves students residing in areas within Old Town Algonquin, as well as areas immediately north and east of there.
Algonquin Lakes Elementary School (K-5) serves students residing in far eastern sections of the village. It is in Kane County.
Lake in the Hills Elementary School (K-5) serves students that live in Lake in the Hills.
Liberty Elementary School (K-5) in nearby Carpentersville serves students living in the Brittany Hills, Providence Point, Providence Point 2, and Shenandoah neighborhoods.
Westfield Community School (K-8) is a combined elementary-middle school. The elementary school serves the Willoughby Farms area. In addition to Westfield Elementary, Neubert, Lincoln Prairie, and Lake in the Hills elementary schools feed into Westfield Middle School. Westfield Middle School feeds mostly into Jacobs High School.
Dundee Middle School (6-8) in nearby Dundee serves students living in the Liberty Elementary School area and feeds mostly into Jacobs High School.
Algonquin Middle School (6-8) serves Eastview and Algonquin Lakes, and feeds mostly into Dundee-Crown High School.
Harry D. Jacobs High School (9-12) serves high-school aged students residing generally west of the Fox River to just a half mile west of Randall Road.
Dundee-Crown High School (9-12) in nearby Carpentersville serves high school-aged students living in the east half of the village.

School District 158
Consolidated School District 158 is headquartered in Algonquin, and the schools on the Square Barn Road campus serve the village's far western side, as well as portions of neighboring communities Huntley and Lake in the Hills. School District 158 schools serving far western Algonquin include:
Mackeben Elementary School (K-2)
Marion Conley Elementary School (3-5)
Bernice Heinemann Middle School (6-8)
Huntley High School (9-12) in nearby Huntley serves high school-aged students residing in far western sections of the village.

Private schools
St. Margaret Mary Catholic School,
located in the heart of Algonquin, offer private K-8 education. On the west side of town is Foundations Montessori School.

Community colleges
The nearest community colleges are McHenry County College and Elgin Community College. Generally speaking, McHenry County College serves residents residing in District 158 boundaries, while Elgin Community College serves residents residing in District 300 boundaries.

Libraries
The majority of the village is served by the Algonquin Area Public Library District which includes two facilities, the main branch on Harnish, just west of Randall Road, and a second branch on Eastgate, south of Algonquin Road. Both offer educational and reading programs. Huntley Public Library, Dundee Township Library, and the Barrington Area Library also serve certain sections of the village.

Shopping and dining
The village of Algonquin is a center for shopping activities, both regionally and locally. Most of the village's retail is confined to Randall Road and, to a lesser extent, Algonquin Road.

Randall Road Corridor
The Randall Road corridor is a regional shopping, dining, and entertainment corridor that is home to a variety of shopping centers. The retail corridor also extends partially into nearby Lake in the Hills and Carpentersville. In addition to serving the needs of the local western Algonquin area, the corridor also functions as a major destination retail area serving a vast region that includes most of McHenry and northern Kane Counties.

East Algonquin Road Corridor
The East Algonquin Road retail corridor is primarily a neighborhood retail area that serves the general needs of eastern Algonquin and also portions of nearby Carpentersville and Barrington. The area is centered on Algonquin's first shopping center, Algonquin Town Center, which was constructed in the late 1980s.

Major retailers along the corridor include Dollar Tree, Goodwill Industries, Jewel-Osco, and Walgreens. Restaurants include Donkey Inn Bar and Grill, McDonald's, Subway, China Dragon, Jimmy John's, Starbucks, Chubby's Gyros, Gourmet House, and Antigua Mexican Grill. Auto-related uses include Merlin Muffler, Super Wash, Goodyear Tires, Francen & Son, Marathon, and Phillips 66. The corridor also includes fitness centers Snap Fitness and Pro Fitness. Chase Bank, First Merit Bank, Algonquin State Bank, and Stop & Store Self Storage are also present along the corridor.

West Algonquin Road Corridor
Like the East Algonquin Road Corridor, the West Algonquin Road Corridor is a neighborhood retail area, composed mostly of small retail shops, restaurants, and neighborhood services. This is a newer retail area, with most of the retailers having been constructed in the 1990s and 2000s. The corridor predominantly serves western Algonquin and Lake in the Hills.

A Walgreens at the corner of Algonquin and Square Barn Roads serves as an anchor in an area that features an abundance of small shops. Algonquin Bank & Trust is also nearby. Restaurants include Burrito, Buddyz Chicago Pizzeria, Aroma Tapas, Domino's Pizza, China Bistro, Kosta's Gyros, Subway, @Bangkok Thai, and Taylor Street Pizza. Auto-related uses include Jiffy Lube/Super Brite and Discount Tire.

Old Town District
The village's Old Town District, focused primarily along Main Street/Illinois Route 31 includes dozens of independent retailers and franchises, offices, and fine restaurants. Other strip centers can be found nearby along Route 31 including the Fox River Center and Edgewood Plaza.

Industry
A growing number of businesses can be found in Algonquin. From a manufacturing corridor along Algonquin Road between Pyott Road and Route 31 to a planned corporate campus on the west side of Randall Road, industry is a significant part of the Algonquin area economy.

Algonquin Industrial Park
Just west of the village's Old Town District is the Algonquin Industrial Park, located along Algonquin Road. Several major companies can be found in this area, including tool, die, and mold industries, plastics industries, and transportation-related businesses. Algonquin's main Post Office is also located in this area. The post office also serves nearby Lake in the Hills, even though the two municipalities have separate zip codes.

Algonquin Corporate Campus
Under development is the Algonquin Corporate Campus on the village's west side along Randall Road. Set on over  stretching from Randall Road west to Square Barn Road, and north of Huntley Road, the development is aimed at providing more jobs to the greater Algonquin area. As a result, any potential business or building in the park that brings high-paying jobs has the opportunity for incentives and to have the development review process expedited. Located in the park is Young Innovations, a company that specializes in oral healthcare supplies; and Advantage Moving and Storage, a moving and storage company. Two multi-tenant industrial/office buildings have also been constructed, Rothbart Building #1 and the Algonquin Corporate Condominiums, both of which already have tenants, including Progressive Solutions and DirecTV. Additional buildings are planned for construction. Businesses the village is targeting for the park include those specializing in healthcare, technology, and research and development. Located directly adjacent to the Algonquin Corporate Campus are the village's outdoor malls Algonquin Commons and Algonquin Galleria. Also part of the park is the mixed-use Esplanade development, which currently includes 2nd and 3rd story office space for several companies.

Other industries
Other major industries in Algonquin include Duro-Life, a manufacturer of machine parts located along Randall Road, and Meyer Material Service, a mining company located along Route 31.

The largest such series of office buildings is the Briarwood Center at the intersection of Randall Road and County Line Road.

Recreation
The village does not have an actual park district, as park operations are run by the village itself. Nevertheless, the quality of parks, trails, and programs is nearly unmatched. In addition, the village's scenic waterways remain a regional draw. Some noteworthy recreational opportunities in Algonquin include:
Downtown Algonquin, a compact downtown featuring several shops and restaurants near the Fox River, as well as features like upscale lighting, planters, and well-kept sidewalks.
The Fox River, a major tributary in Illinois which runs north-south through the heart of the village's downtown.
Fox River Trail/McHenry County Prairie Path, a sub-section of the Grand Illinois Trail
A  trail system consisting of a mixture of off-road neighborhood trail systems and on-street route designations
Golf Club of Illinois, a public golf course on the village's southern end.
Lifetime Fitness, a chain fitness center with a sizable location in Algonquin. Other fitness centers include Cardinal Fitness and Fitness 19.
Kelliher Park, a park on the village's far western side featuring several ballfields.
Ted Spella Park, a large park under development on the village's west side.
Snapper Field and Lions Pool, a recreational complex near Algonquin Middle School featuring ballfields and the municipal pool
Towne Park, Cornish Park, and Riverfront Park, three parks located in the village's downtown, significant for the role they play in the popular Founders Days festival and several other downtown events throughout the year.
Presidential Park, an important recreational area for the village's eastside residents, it features several ballfields and open areas, as well as a few picnic shelters.
Algonquin Lakes, a grouping of natural and man-made lakes, trails, and adjacent community park in a residential neighborhood by the same name on the village's eastern side.
Manchester Lakes, a grouping of man-made lakes, recreational areas, and complex bike path system within a neighborhood by the same name on the village's far western side.
Woods Creek, a scenic creek, nature preserve, and trail which runs south-north through the village's far western side
Hill Climb Park, a relatively new park at the intersection of Circle and Huntington Drives
ALITHSA, the Algonquin Lake in the Hills Soccer Association, which provides fall and spring season soccer experiences for children ages four through high school.
AAYO, the Algonquin Area Youth Organization, which utilizes many of the ballfields in the area for tee-ball, softball, and baseball leagues for children from age five to high school.

Festivals and traditions
The Hill Climb Race, a very historic tradition in the village in which classic cars are driven up a hill in the southwestern part of downtown. According to tradition, in the infancy of automobile production, a car's worth was judged based upon its ability to climb this particular hill in the town. The event is held in the spring.
Farmers' Markets, held every Thursday afternoon, from late May through early October at Riverfront Park
Summer Concert Series, held in the village's downtown parks, it features several outdoor musical performances by local and regional acts on several weekends during the summer.
Conservation Community Day, a family-oriented program educating the public about the importance of the conservation of natural resources and the protection of the environment. The event is held along Woods Creek on the village's west side in June.
Art on the Fox, a fine art festival held at Riverfront Park, usually in June or July. Artwork is showcased and sold at the event, and live musical entertainment and artist demonstrations are sometimes featured as well.
Founders' Days, the village's cornerstone festival and tradition, it includes a carnival, parade, fireworks display, bags tournament, Founders Run, Taste of Algonquin, and 7 year strong barcrawl starting at Tavern at the Bridge and ending at Riverview. It is always held on the last full weekend in July.
National Night Out, a national event that the village participates in, which is designed to promote community spirit and awareness in order to combat crime. Held in early August at Snapper Field and Lions-Armstrong Memorial Pool on the east side of the village.
Old Time Country Harvest Festival, a fall festival occurring every October that features a farmers' market, cemetery walk, and other activities, in the Old Town District.
A number of events held annually at Algonquin Commons, including Touch-a-Truck, summer concerts, holiday carriage rides, and other special events.
Holiday Rock on the Fox, a winter festival in downtown Algonquin that is held in early December.
Algonquin's Public Art Program, which showcases pieces of artwork at prominent public locations in the village throughout the year. The program emphasizes the various styles of artwork and the importance of art in the community. The artwork is rotated annually.
Polish-American Fest, held at Saint Margaret Mary's Catholic Church. Algonquin has one of the largest Polish communities in the Chicago suburbs.
Miracle On Main, is a festival found on Main Street and adjacent areas.  All of the events associated with it typically take place on the first Saturday of December; celebrating the holiday season. The event features ice sculptures, live performances and more festive festivities.

Transportation
Algonquin is a center of transportation for McHenry and Kane Counties. Some of the major roadways include:
Randall Road is a major multi-lane highway serving the village's western side. The road is entirely lined with major outdoor shopping malls, big-box retailers, restaurants, and a major corporate center which serve the region. For a mile-long stretch between Harnish Drive and Corporate Parkway, near the village's malls, the road is six lanes wide with a landscaped center median with dual left turn lanes. Elsewhere, the road is four lanes wide with a striped median with single left turn lanes. The road connects Algonquin with Crystal Lake and Lake in the Hills on the north and Carpentersville, Elgin, South Elgin, Geneva, and the rest of the Fox River Valley suburbs to the south.
Illinois Route 25 is a north-south road on the village's eastern side which ends at Illinois Route 62. It connects the village to Carpentersville, East Dundee, Elgin, and the rest of the Fox River Valley suburbs to its south.
Illinois Route 31 (Main Street) is a major north-south road going through the heart of the village's downtown. Despite Route 31's high traffic volume, the road is only two lanes wide with a center striped median and left turn lanes, resulting in considerable backups at the road's intersection with Algonquin Road. In the Old Town District, there are on-street parallel parking spots to service the downtown shops located along the road. Because the shops and many other buildings are so close to the road, widening is not an option to ease traffic congestion, so a western 31 bypass of the village's downtown is planned. This bypass would include an interchange at Algonquin Road, currently one of the most congested intersections in McHenry County. Illinois Route 31 connects to Crystal Lake and McHenry on the north and Carpentersville, West Dundee, Elgin, and St. Charles on the south.
Illinois Route 62 (Algonquin Road) is a major east-west arterial road. West of Illinois Route 31, the road loses the Illinois Route 62 designation and becomes a county highway (Algonquin Road) that continues west to Illinois Route 47. The road is locally infamous for its westbound backups from Sandbloom Road west to Illinois Route 31, particularly during the weekday evening rush hour. Algonquin Road is four lanes with a center median for its entirety in the village. West of Randall Road, the median is landscaped, while east of Randall, it is striped. Algonquin Road connects the village to Huntley on the west and other major northwest suburbs like Hoffman Estates, Schaumburg, Arlington Heights, Mount Prospect, and Des Plaines on the east. West of Pyott Road, Algonquin Road roughly forms the border between Algonquin and Lake in the Hills.
Lake Cook Road terminates at East Algonquin Road on the eastern edge of the village and connects it to Barrington, Palatine, Arlington Heights, Buffalo Grove, Wheeling, Northbrook and Glencoe.
Pyott Road and Lakewood Road terminate at West Algonquin Road, just north of the village limits, and connect the village to Lake in the Hills, Crystal Lake, and Lakewood.
Longmeadow Parkway is a minor east-west road that currently connects Randall Road on the southwest side of the village to IL Route 31. A toll bridge is also being constructed across the Fox River that will connect the road to Sandbloom Road, IL Route 25, and the terminus at IL Route 62 in Barrington Hills. The project will make Longmeadow one of the most important roads in Algonquin and will help alleviate traffic near downtown. This project is expected to be completed by 2021.
Other important roads within Algonquin include Highland Avenue, River Road, Haegers Bend Road, Sandbloom Road, Souwanas Trail, Edgewood Drive, Hanson Road, County Line Road, Sleepy Hollow Road, Huntington Drive, Harnish Drive, Square Barn Road, Stonegate Road, Bunker Hill Drive, Boyer Road, and Corporate Parkway.

Religion
Churches in Algonquin include:
St. Margaret Mary Catholic Church, a large catholic church complex, which includes a church, ministry, rectory, and a private K-8 school, located just east of Old Town Algonquin, along the south side of East Algonquin Road between South Hubbard Street and Eastgate Drive. Since the early 2000s, Algonquin has seen a huge number of Poles migrating to Algonquin and the church holds several services, including Polish speaking masses, for the Polish community. The church is affiliated with the Roman Catholic Diocese of Rockford.
St. John's Evangelical Lutheran Church, a Lutheran church affiliated with the Lutheran Church–Missouri Synod, and located in the Old Town District at the southwest corner of Jefferson and Washington Streets. The church also includes a private K-8 school and a resale shop.
Congregational Church of Algonquin, a church affiliated with the United Church of Christ, located in the Old Town District at the southwest corner of Washington and Harrison Streets.
Light of Christ Lutheran Church, a Lutheran church affiliated with the Evangelical Lutheran Church in America, located on the west side of Hanson Road, just south of Algonquin Road. The church plans to build a new facility at the northeast corner of Sleepy Hollow Road and Longmeadow Parkway.
Christ United Methodist Church, a church affiliated with the United Methodist Church, located just outside village limits on West Algonquin Road, west of Square Barn Road.

Notable people 

 Rockne Brubaker, ice skater, 2-time national champion
 Josh Caterer, musician
 Evan Jager, American record-holder in the 3,000 meter steeplechase and silver medalist at the 2016 Summer Olympics

References

External links
Village of Algonquin official website
Algonquin/Lake in the Hills Chamber of Commerce
History of Algonquin, Il.

 
1834 establishments in Illinois
Chicago metropolitan area
Populated places established in 1834
Villages in Illinois
Villages in Kane County, Illinois
Villages in McHenry County, Illinois